Pravin Harish Zantye is an Indian politician from Maharashtrawadi Gomantak Party. He was elected to the Goa Legislative Assembly from Maem, Goa in the 2017 Goa Legislative Assembly election on Bharatiya Janata Party ticket. Ahead of 2022 Goa Legislative Assembly election, he resigned from the Assembly and BJP, and joined MGP.

His father, Harish Narayan Prabhu Zantye, was a Marathi immigrant who had also been the member of the Goa Legislative Assembly as well as member of the Lok Sabha.

References

Living people
Bharatiya Janata Party politicians from Goa
Maharashtrawadi Gomantak Party politicians
People from North Goa district
1966 births
Goa MLAs 2017–2022